is a 1960 short story by Japanese writer Yukio Mishima.

Plot
The story of Patriotism centers around the experiences of Lieutenant Shinji Takeyama and his young wife, Reiko, and their ritualistic suicide following the Ni Ni Roku Incident, a mutiny against the Imperial Army in 1936. Their suicide is discussed in brief at the very beginning of the story, and then followed by an introduction to the characters and their daily lives.

The focus of the story takes place across three days, beginning on February 26, and ending on February 28, 1936. On the morning of the 26th, the lieutenant leaves in a hurry to the sound of a bugle; he does not return until the evening of the 28th. When he does return, he tells his wife of the mutiny in the army ranks, and that the following morning, he will be in command of a unit ordered to attack the mutineers. Most of these mutineers are friends of his.

Unable to choose between loyalty to the Emperor and loyalty to his comrades, he informs his wife that he will kill himself that evening, and she immediately requests to accompany him in his endeavour. He asks her to be a witness to his own suicide, and she agrees.

The lieutenant kills himself by seppuku later that same evening; this is described in a violent, lyrical display, typical of Mishima's literary style.

The writing reflects on the interlacing of mundanity and beauty, as when the intensity of passion that the husband and wife share for one another is related to the description of the couple in the photograph taken at their wedding, a recurring reference throughout the story.

Background
"Patriotism" was written in the autumn of 1960, shortly after the Anpo disturbances, which were said to have prompted Mishima's public turn towards right-wing politics. A film of the same title was released in 1966, co-directed by Yukio Mishima and Masaki Domoto.

It was translated into English in 1966. The character  (yū) actually means "worry" or "concern", and though Yūkoku is translated as "patriotism", the word bears with it a meaning more congruent with "concern for one's country" rather than patriotism directly.

Mishima later placed it together with the play Toka no Kiku and Eirei no Koe in a single volume, the Ni Ni Roku Trilogy.

References

1960 short stories
Short stories by Yukio Mishima
Japanese short stories
Japanese short stories adapted into films
1960 in Japan
Works originally published in Japanese magazines